The 2009 Open Prévadiès was a professional tennis tournament played on outdoor red clay courts. It was part of the 2009 ATP Challenger Tour. It took place in Saint-Brieuc, France between 30 March and 5 April 2009.

Singles entrants

Seeds

Rankings are as of March 23, 2009.

Other entrants
The following players received wildcards into the singles main draw:
  Charles-Antoine Brézac
  Jonathan Dasnières de Veigy
  Romain Jouan
  Mathieu Rodrigues

The following players received entry from the qualifying draw:
  Guillermo Alcaide
  Jean-Christophe Faurel
  James McGee
  Carles Poch Gradin

The following player received special exempt into the main draw:
  Jan Minář

Champions

Men's singles

 Josselin Ouanna def.  Adrian Mannarino, 7–5, 1–6, 6–4

Men's doubles

 David Martin /  Simon Stadler def.  Peter Luczak /  Joseph Sirianni, 6–3, 6–2

References
2009 Draws
French Tennis Federation International Tournaments official website
ITF Search 

Open Prevadies
Saint-Brieuc Challenger
2009 in French tennis
March 2009 sports events in Europe
April 2009 sports events in Europe